The 2014 UCI Mountain Bike & Trials World Championships was the 25th edition of the UCI Mountain Bike & Trials World Championships, held in Hafjell and Lillehammer, Norway.

Medal summary

Men's events

Women's events

Team events

Medal table

See also
2014 UCI Mountain Bike World Cup

References

External links
Official website
AllSportDB.com event page

 
UCI Mountain Bike World Championships
UCI Mountain Bike World Championships
International cycle races hosted by Norway
UCI Mountain Bike World Championships
Sport in Lillehammer
Øyer
Sport in Oppland
Mountain biking events in Norway